Saša Antunović (born 4 November 1974) is a Serbian former professional footballer who played as a centre forward.

Career
Antunović started out with his hometown club Priština and played in the Second League of FR Yugoslavia. He subsequently moved to Čukarički and also scored once in the 1996 UEFA Intertoto Cup. Later on, Antunović returned to his parent club Priština for one season, before joining newly promoted First League of FR Yugoslavia side Sartid Smederevo in 1998. He spent the next four years with the Oklopnici.

In 2002, Antunović moved abroad to Bulgarian club Spartak Varna. He then returned to Sartid Smederevo in early 2004. During the 2004–05 season, Antunović moved back to Bulgaria and joined Lokomotiv Sofia. He made 78 appearances and scored 30 goals for the side in the top flight.

Personal life
In 2009, Antunović took part in the third season of the Bulgarian reality show VIP Brother.

References

External links
 
 
 

Association football forwards
Big Brother (Bulgarian TV series) contestants
First Professional Football League (Bulgaria) players
Expatriate footballers in Bulgaria
FC Lokomotiv 1929 Sofia players
FC Prishtina players
First League of Serbia and Montenegro players
FK Čukarički players
FK Hajduk Beograd players
FK Smederevo players
Kosovo Serbs
PFC Kom-Minyor players
PFC Spartak Varna players
Serbia and Montenegro expatriate footballers
Serbia and Montenegro expatriate sportspeople in Bulgaria
Serbia and Montenegro footballers
Serbian expatriate footballers
Serbian expatriate sportspeople in Bulgaria
Serbian footballers
Sportspeople from Pristina
1974 births
Living people